Newstead and Annesley railway station was a station on the Great Northern Railway's Nottingham to Shirebrook line.

History

Present day 
No trace of the station remains. The site is now a country park.

References

 http://www.disused-stations.org.uk/a/annesley/

Disused railway stations in Nottinghamshire
Railway stations in Great Britain opened in 1882
Railway stations in Great Britain closed in 1931
Former Great Northern Railway stations